Dodoma Jiji Football Club is a Tanzanian football club based in Dodoma City.

The club won promotion to the Tanzanian Premier League for the 2020–21 season.

References 

Football clubs in Tanzania